Grigore D. Constantinescu (February 15, 1875 in Iaşi – April 7, 1932 in Năpădeni) was a priest and journalist from Romania. He was the director of Glasul Basarabiei.

Biography 
Grigore D. Constantinescu was born on February 15, 1875, in a family of a priest from Iaşi, Romania. He studied in Iaşi (1888–1896) and Kiev (1897–1902) and worked for the Romanian Consulate to Odessa (1904–1906) and professor of Romanian language at the Chişinău Theological Seminary and Diocesan Girls' School in Chişinău (1906–1918), priest in Chişinău (1918–1919) and in Năpădeni (1919–1932). He had ten children

Constantinescu was a contributor to Basarabia (newspaper) and from January 1, 1908 on, he was the Editorial Secretary of Luminătorul. Constantinescu was the founder and director of Glasul Basarabiei (1913–1914).

References

Bibliography 
 Iurie Colesnic, Basarabia necunoscuta, Ed. Universitas, Chisinau, 1993; vol. 1.
 Viaţa Basarabiei, ANUL I. No.4 Aprilie 1932.
 Almanahul dicţionar al presei din România şi a celei româneşti de pretutindeni de G. Caliga. – București, 1926. – P. 155.

External links 
 Grigore Constantinescu
 PRESA BASARABEANĂ de la începuturi pînă în anul 1957. Catalog
 GRIGORE D. CONSTANTINESCU
 Grigore D. Constantinescu
 Mormântul preotului ziarist GRIGORE CONSTANTINESCU (1875-1932)

1875 births
Writers from Iași
Eastern Orthodox Christians from Romania
Romanian journalists
Moldovan journalists
Male journalists
1932 deaths